This is a list of K-12 schools in Adams County, Colorado by district.

Adams 12 Five Star Schools

Elementary

References

Schools in Adams County, Colorado
Adams County